The 1985 Scott Tournament of Hearts, the Canadian women's curling championship, was held from February 23 to March 2, 1985 at the Winnipeg Arena in Winnipeg, Manitoba. The total attendance for the week was 18,203. This would be the first year in which the champion would automatically qualify to next year's tournament as Team Canada.

Team British Columbia, who was skipped by Linda Moore won the event by defeating Newfoundland 13–7 in the final in nine ends, marking the first time a final was conceded prior to ten ends being completed. This was BC's fifth title overall and the only title skipped by Moore.

They were also the last team until  to finish round robin play unbeaten and the last team until  to not lose a single game in the tournament.

Moore's rink would go onto represent Canada in the 1985 World Women's Curling Championship in Jönköping, Sweden, which they also won.

The final would set records for the most points scored by one team in a final (13), the most combined points scored in a final (20), and the highest score in one end with hammer in a final (five by BC in the first end). The most points and combined points records remain finals records while the highest score with hammer was matched in the 2023 final.

Teams
The teams were listed as follows:
{| border=1 cellpadding=5 cellspacing=0
!bgcolor="#0033ff" width="200"|
!bgcolor="#0099ff" width="200"|British Columbia
!bgcolor="#ffff99" width="200"|Manitoba
!bgcolor="#ffff33" width="200"|New Brunswick
|- align=center
|align=left|  North Hill CC, Calgary 
Skip:  Susan Seitz
Third:  Judy Lukowich
Second:  Judy Erickson
Lead: Betty McCracken
|align=left| North Vancouver CC, North Vancouver 
Skip:  Linda Moore
Third: Lindsay Sparkes 
Second: Debbie Jones
Lead: Laurie Carney
|align=left| Portage la Prairie CC, Portage la Prairie 
Skip:  Jacki Rintoul
Third: Merline Darbyshire
Second: Carolyn Darbyshire
Lead: Yvonne Beaudin
|align=left| Thistle St. Andrews CC, Saint John 
Skip:  Marlene Vaughn
Third: Judy Connor
Second: Gail Shields
Lead: Pauline Lynch
|- border=1 cellpadding=5 cellspacing=0
!bgcolor="#ff5577" width="200"|Newfoundland
!bgcolor="#cc99ee" width="200"|Nova Scotia
!bgcolor="#ff7777" width="200"|Ontario
!bgcolor="#009900" width="200"|Prince Edward Island
|- align=center
|align=left| Carol CC, Labrador City 
Skip:  Sue Anne Bartlett 
Third: Patricia Dwyer
Second: Margaret Knickle
Lead: Debbie Herbert
|align=left| CFB Halifax CC, Halifax 
Skip:  Virginia Jackson
Third: Marg Cutcliffe
Second: Joan Hutchinson
Lead: Sherry Jackson
|align=left| Roseland CC, Windsor 
Skip:  Pam Leavitt
Third: Susan Bell
Second: Bev Mainwaring
Lead: Deb Brousseau
|align=left| Charlottetown CC, Charlottetown 
Skip:  Kim Dolan
Third: Cathy Dillon
Second: Kathie Gallant
Lead: Karen MacDonald
|- border=1 cellpadding=5 cellspacing=0
!bgcolor="#00ffff" width="200"|Quebec 
!bgcolor="#33cc00" width="200"|Saskatchewan
!bgcolor="#cccccc" width="200"|Yukon/Northwest Territories
|- align=center
|align=left| Buckingham CC, Buckingham 
Skip:  Nicole Filion
Third: Julie Graham
Second: June Lamarre
Lead: Mary Duranceau
|align=left| Nutana CC, Saskatoon 
Skip:  Sheila Rowan
Third: Jean MacLean
Second: Maureen Burkitt
Lead: Eileen Wilson
|align=left| Whitehorse CC, Whitehorse 
Skip:  Shelly Bildfell
Third: Betty McCrae
Second: Lou McCrae
Lead: Dale Twa
|}

Round Robin StandingsFinal Round Robin standingsRound Robin results
All draw times are listed in Central Standard Time (UTC-06:00).

Draw 1Saturday, February 23, 7:30 pmDraw 2Sunday, February 24, 2:00 pmDraw 3Sunday, February 24, 7:30 pmDraw 4Monday, February 25, 2:00 pmDraw 5Monday, February 25, 7:30 pmDraw 6Tuesday, February 26, 2:00 pmDraw 7Tuesday, February 26, 7:30 pmDraw 8Wednesday, February 27, 2:00 pmDraw 9Wednesday, February 27, 7:30 pmDraw 10Thursday, February 28, 2:00 pmDraw 11Thursday, February 28, 7:30 pmTiebreakerFriday, March 1, 2:00 pmPlayoffs

SemifinalFriday, March 1, 7:30 pmFinalSaturday, March 2, 1:00 pmStatistics
Top 5 player percentagesFinal Round Robin Percentages''

Awards
The all-star team and sportsmanship award winners were as follows:

All-Star Team

Lura McLuckie Award 
The Scotties Tournament of Hearts Sportsmanship Award is presented to the curler who best embodies the spirit of curling at the Scotties Tournament of Hearts. The winner was selected in a vote by all players at the tournament. 

Prior to 1998, the award was named after a notable individual in the curling community where the tournament was held that year. For this edition, the award was named after Lura McLuckie, a builder for women's curling as she was the president of both the Manitoba Ladies Curling Association and Canadian Ladies Curling Association and guided a Scottish women's tour along with helping launch the Canadian Junior Women's Curling Championship.

References

Scotties Tournament of Hearts
Scott Tournament of Hearts
Scott Tournament Of Hearts, 1985
Curling competitions in Winnipeg
Scott Tournament of Hearts
Scott Tournament of Hearts
Scott Tournament of Hearts